Dermanak (also Romanized as Darmank and Dormonak; also known as Dirmanik) is a village in Talkh Ab Rural District, Khenejin District, Farahan County, Markazi Province, Iran. At the 2006 census, its population was 173, in 63 families.

References 

Populated places in Farahan County